Frederick William Wray  (29 September 1864 – 18 November 1943) was an Australian Anglican minister, army chaplain and colonial militia. Wray was born in Taradale, Victoria, and died in Sandringham, Melbourne, Victoria. His father was English-born and his mother was Irish.

See also

 Field Flowers Goe

References

Australian Anglican priests
Australian Army chaplains
Australian military personnel of World War I
Australian people of English descent
Australian people of Irish descent
1864 births
1943 deaths
Military personnel from Victoria (Australia)
Australian Companions of the Order of St Michael and St George
Australian Commanders of the Order of the British Empire